Eighteen is a special digital single by the South Korean girl group, CLC. It was released April 5, 2015 by Cube Entertainment, and was later included on CLC's third extended play, Refresh.

Background and promotion
CLC released the special digital single, "Eighteen" after less than a month of debut. "Eighteen" is a 60-70's motown and synthpop 80's song that expresses youthful love experienced when you're 18.  On March 17, the group started to promote the song by performing their first stage on KBS's Music Bank.

Track listing

Charts

References

Cube Entertainment singles
CLC (group) songs
2015 singles
2015 songs
Korean-language songs